Pallithode is a village in the Alappuzha district, in the state of Kerala, India, on the shores of the Arabian Sea. Pallithode is within the Gram Panchayat of Kuthiathode, Pattanakad Block, of Cherthala Taluk. During the 20th century, more than half of its width was eroded away by the action of river backwaters and the sea. The village is very densely populated and has a wet, maritime tropical climate. It has an important role in the fishing industry.

History
In ancient times, Pallithode was a border post marking the northern border of the Kingdom of Travancore (16th century to 1947), adjacent to Chellanam, a southern border post of the Kingdom of Cochin (Kochi) (12th century to 1947) and which now marks the southern border of Ernakulam district. The border posts demarcated the kingdom boundaries and controlled trade between the kingdoms, which competed with each other for dominance and territory by means of war and diplomacy. Pallithode, as a border village, felt these struggles more intensely.

The arrival of foreign traders, starting with the Portuguese in 1498, followed by the Dutch, and then the British, made the situation more complex. The kingdoms received military aid from the foreigners to fight one another, and ended up being ruled by them, finally as princely states under the British. Under British administration, trade restrictions continued, and the border checkpoints were maintained for collection of trade taxes, part of which went to British coffers.

Stability was finally achieved—with the independence of India in 1947, and with the formation of the State of Travancore-Cochin (Thiru-Kochi) in 1949—by the merger of these two princely states of British India. Pallithode became a village of Alappuzha district bordering Ernakulam district.

Geography

Pallithode is a green, palm-fringed, scenic village in the coastal region of Kerala, on a narrow strip of land, with white, sandy beaches bordering the Arabian Sea to the west, and a lake (kayal)—the Pallithode Pozhi, a part of the Cochin estuary—to the east, as well as extensive, interconnected paddy fields and backwaters to the east of the Pozhi. In the old days the only access to Pallithode was by water but this has changed today with modern roads, bridges and State Highway 66 (Kerala) (SH66) passing through Pallithode. Chappakadavu beach, in South Pallithode, provides local fishing boats access to the sea. Chellanam is to the north; Valiathode, Parayakad, Chavadi, and Thuravoor are to the east; Andhakaranazhy ( west of National Highway 66 at Pattanakad), Manokkam Harbor, Azheekal, and Ottamassery are to the south.

The coastal land masses are formed or modified both by action of the sea currents and tides, and by the rainwater flow through the estuaries, from the rivers and backwater systems, supplying sediments. Deposition or erosion of coastal areas are common and dynamic. Sea erosion claims land in some areas with the eroded soil being deposited in other areas. Severe floods and tidal changes have caused more abrupt and drastic transformations at times. The Cochin estuary itself is said to have resulted from the floods of 1341, which caused the silting up of the ancient harbor of Muziris and the opening of the channel at Cochin Azhi.

Chellanam, on Pallithode's northern border, extends from Kattiparambu (near Thoppumpady) in the north to St. George's Church at the Pallithode border, where a channel known as Andhakaranazhy once passed through to the sea at the church's current location. The channel connected Pallithode Pozhi to the sea. This channel closed later naturally and reformed at a more southern location and came to be known as the present Andhakaranazhy. Although Pallithode Pozhi is no longer an estuary, but a kayal, or lake, no longer connected directly to the sea except by canals, the name remains..

Recent sea erosion has caused loss of more than half the width of the village in the 20th century. This recent erosion, in many geological analyses, is considered to be an indirect result of the man-made development of the Cochin estuary into Cochin harbor. Sea erosion has been controlled for the last three decades by seawalls. The price paid is the loss of the once long and beautiful white sandy beaches, except in a few areas left free of seawalls. Mechanized gates, where the backwaters flow into the Arabian Sea, regulate the flow of seawater entering the paddy fields of Pallithode, Thuravoor, Pattanakad, and Ezhupunna, and they also prevent flooding of paddy fields during heavy rainfalls.

Climate
Pallithode's has a wet and maritime tropical climate, classified as a tropical monsoon climate under the  Köppen climate classification.

Demographics
The population is mainly Christian with a minority of Hindus.St.Sebastian’s Catholic Church in Pallithode is built in Portuguese architectural style and dates from 1880.  The nearest major Hindu temple is the ancient Thuravoor Mahakshetram.

The local employment is mainly in the fishing industry or agriculture.

Government
Pallithode is in the Kerala Legislative Assembly constituency of Aroor and the Indian Parliamentary constituency of Alappuzha.

Transportation

Roads
Pallithode village is connected to the nearest towns by NH-47, Thuravoor-Ezhupunna Road, and the Pallithode-Chellanam-Kochi Beach Road (State Highway 66 (Kerala)). The Kerala State Road Transport Corporation (KSRTC), and a number of private bus operators, provide bus service connecting the village to Ernakulam and Alappuzha.

Rail
The Alapuzha-Ernakulam Railway has a crossing station at Thuravoor providing access to the national railways. The Ernakulam-Kayamkulam coastal railway line connects to the national railways at Kayamkulam Junction railway station.

Inland waterways
Inland waterway canals and backwaters with chains of lakes connect Pallithode with Kochi in the north and Alappuzha (Alleppey) in the south through National Waterway 3. A canal links Pallithode Pozhi to Chappakadvu.

Economy
Pallithode is a densely populated village with important fishing and tourism industries.

Fisheries
The Kerala state government has designated Pallithode as a fishing village for development and has allocated funds. The Manakkodam minor fishing harbor is projected for up-gradation.  Chappakadavu in Pallithode is among the major fish landings on the Kerala coast.  The Central Marine Fisheries Research Institute (CMFRI), the Central Institute of Fisheries Technology (CIFT), and the Fisheries ministry of Kerala use Pallithode as a field station for research and development of fisheries projects. Pallithode is also a model village in the pilot project of rainwater harvesting sponsored by the Center for Science and Environment to supplement sources of drinking water.

Tourism
Tourism is a fast developing industry of increasing importance in the Kerala economy. Pallithode with its indisputable scenic beauty is playing its part in the tourism industry.  There are cruises on offer in Pallithode Pozhi and surrounds, including excursions to Andhakaranazhy. The sandy beaches are attractive to visitors. Resorts in the backwaters of Pallithode cater to Indian and international tourists. The Kerala government has developed infrastructure at Andhakaranazhy and its beaches to cater to tourists.  Ecotourism is being promoted by the Kerala State Tourism  Department and nongovernmental agencies.  Kumbalangi, the first model tourism village in India, is close by.  Help and guidance in setting up ecotourism ventures is provided by tourism offices. It's common to have visitors housed with local families, to gain insights into local culture and lifestyle. Apart from local excursions and cultural events, this may include agricultural or fish farm activities. NGO’s, including Women’s Initiative groups (WIN Society), and Farmer’s Co-operatives, give assistance and financial support in setting up homestays and associated activities.

Places of interest

Pallithode Pozhi
The Pallithode Pozhi is a backwater lake that is situated very close to the sea, less than two to three hundred meters in many spots. Its network of canals connects it to the Arabian Sea at Andhakaranazhy, as well as to the Kerala backwaters system, and by the Kuthiathode Canal to Vembanad Kayal. The Pozhi, lined with Chinese fishing nets (cheenavala), and the neighboring paddy fields are important sources of freshwater fish, as well as a scenic lake important to tourism.

The action of the sea and backwaters have caused changes in geography through the ages, changes in the nature and location of the sea outlets of the backwater system in the remote past, and the loss of land mass due to sea erosion in the more recent times.

Andhakaranazhy
Andhakaranazhy means "Azhi of darkness".  It is a part of the Kerala backwater system at the Arabian Sea. There are sandy beaches at Andhakaranazhy. The area has been developed by the Kerala Tourism Development Corporation into a tourist spot. There are Restaurants and an aerial walkway.  It is a natural harbor rated as a minor port by the Central Port Authority. The Kerala government, the Indian Ports Association, and the Inland Waterways Authority of India are planning its development jointly.

Manakkodam fishing harbor, with its lighthouse, is at Andhakaranazhy, and is designated as a minor port and a green field site.

Chappakadavu
Chappakadavu is the mainstay of the fishing industry in the area. Earlier it was a unique place close to the sea, with a canal having quick and easy access to the backwater system and thence to the consumers. Now transport is mainly overland, but the prominence of this fish processing area and market continues. The provision of the fishing gap has helped to retain the importance of Chappakadavu.

Notes

References

Further reading

External links
 Archives of India  Model fishing village scheme
Livemint About ecology of wetlands

Villages in Alappuzha district